Cathy O'Brien or Kathy O'Brien is the name of

 Cathy O'Brien (conspiracy theorist) (born 1957), American conspiracy theorist
 Cathy O'Brien (runner) (born 1967), American marathon runner

See also
 Kate O'Brien (disambiguation)
Catherine O'Brien (disambiguation)